Xerochrysum (syn. Bracteantha) is a genus of flowering plants native to Australia. It was defined by Russian botanist Nikolai Tzvelev in 1990, preceding (and taking precedence over) Bracteantha which was described the following year. A 2002 molecular study of the tribe Gnaphalieae has indicated the genus is probably polyphyletic, with X. bracteatum and X. viscosum quite removed from each other.

Species
This genus and its species names were formerly included in Bracteantha and before that in Helichrysum.

 the authoritative Australian Plant Name Index recognises seven formally named species and five accepted species awaiting formal naming, description and publication:

 Xerochrysum bicolor  – Tasmania
 Xerochrysum bracteatum  , strawflower or golden everlasting – NSW, Vic, Tas, SA, Qld, NT, WA
 Xerochrysum collierianum  – Tasmania
 Xerochrysum palustre , swamp everlasting, syn.: Bracteantha sp. aff. subundulata – Vic, Tas
 Xerochrysum papillosum  – Vic, Tas
 Xerochrysum subundulatum , alpine everlasting or orange everlasting – NSW, ACT, Vic, Tas
 Xerochrysum viscosum , sticky everlasting – NSW, ACT, Qld, Vic

Species provisionally named, described and accepted by the authoritative Australian Plant Name Index while awaiting formal publication
 Xerochrysum sp. Glencoe (M.Gray 4401) NE Herbarium – Qld, NSW
 Xerochrysum sp. Mt Merino [Lamington National Park] (S.T.Blake 22869) NE Herbarium – Qld, NSW
 Xerochrysum sp. New England (L.M.Copeland 3731) NE Herbarium – NSW
 Xerochrysum sp. North Stradbroke Island (L.Durrington 675) NE Herbarium – Qld, NSW
 Xerochrysum sp. Point Lookout (I.R.Telford 12830) NE Herbarium – NSW

References

External links 

ASGAP: Xerochrysum bracteatum and Xerochrysum subundulatum
PlantNET: Xerochrysum
PlantNET: Key to Xerochrysum

 
Asteraceae genera